Mah-e-Tamaam was a 2018 Pakistani drama produced by Momina Duraid under the banner MD Productions. It was directed by Syed Ahmed Kamran and written by Amna Riaz, and starred Naveen Waqar, Emmad Irfani, Ramsha Khan and Wahaj Ali in lead roles. 

It aired on Hum Pashto 1 in Pashto language under the same title.

Cast
Wahaj Ali as Taqi Lodhi
Ramsha Khan as Shifa Taqi Lodhi
Naveen Waqar as Samahir
Emmad Irfani as Umair
Hafsa Butt as Samar
Yasir Alam as Sameer
Laila Zuberi as Salima
Asad Siddiqui as Rohel
Afraz Rasool
Fahima Awan as Sabi
Manzoor Qureshi as Abdul Baqir Lodhi 
Parveen Akbar as Tai jan
Seemi Pasha as Aliya
Nawal Saeed as Ramla
Tabbasum Arif as Sarwat (Samar's mother)
Kainat Chohan
Zia Gurchani
Natalia Awais as Mehak

See also 
 List of programs broadcast by Hum TV

References

External links 
 Hum TV official website

2018 Pakistani television series debuts